The  is a Japanese railway line operated by the private railway operator Keio Corporation, connecting Hashimoto Station in Sagamihara, Kanagawa Prefecture and Chōfu Station in Chōfu, Tokyo.

Station list
Rapid and Semi express services stop at all stations on this line.

Notes:

History
The line opened as a one-stop single-track spur from Chōfu to Keiō-Tamagawa on 1 June 1916, electrified at 600 V DC, and was double-tracked on 1 April 1924. On 1 May 1937, Tamagawara was renamed Keiō-Tamagawa, and on 4 August 1963, the voltage was increased to 1,500 V DC.

The line was extended (all extensions were electrified dual track) on 1 April 1971, to Keiō-Yomiuri-Land. Subsequent extensions brought the line to Keiō-Tama-Center (18 October 1974), Minami-Ōsawa (22 May 1988) and Hashimoto (30 March 1990). Tamasakai station opened on 6 April 1991.

In 2012, the Chofu to Keiō-Tamagawa section was relocated underground.

Station numbering was introduced on 22 February 2013.

See also
 List of railway lines in Japan

References
This article incorporates material from the corresponding article in the Japanese Wikipedia.

External links

Company website (in English)

 
4 ft 6 in gauge railways in Japan
Sagamihara Line
Railway lines in Kanagawa Prefecture
Railway lines in Tokyo
Railway lines opened in 1916
1916 establishments in Japan